Kiryat Bialik (also Qiryat Bialik) is a city in the Haifa District in Israel. It is one of the five Krayot suburbs to the north of Haifa.

The city was named after the poet Hayim Nahman Bialik.

History
In 1924, Ephraim and Sabina Katz, who immigrated from Romania, were the first Jews to settle in the Zevulun Valley in Haifa Bay.  Their farm was destroyed in the 1929 Palestine riots. The one house that survived the riots, Beit Katz, was bequeathed to Kiryat Bialik in 1959 and designated for public use.

The town of Kiryat Bialik was established in July 1934 by a group of German Jewish immigrants who received a plot of land from  the Jewish National Fund. The residents were mainly free professionals,  doctors, engineers and lawyers who lived in private homes with gardens. During World War II, Kiryat Bialik was bombed due to its proximity to the oil refineries in Haifa.

In 1950, it was declared a local council, attaining city status in 1976.

Local government

Mayors
  (1945-1985); 
  (1985-2003);
  (2003-2008);
  (2008-)

Neighborhoods 
Bialik South - the southern neighborhood of Kiryat Bialik. In this neighborhood,  was established, the largest school in Israel. 
 Sabinia -  named after Sabina Katz - was established in the 1930s. Sabinia Center is nowadays a shopping center.
  - the northern neighborhood in Kiryat Bialik. At the time of its establishment, it was inhabited mainly by immigrants. To the north of it is an extensive area of light industry.
 The Butterfly -  a neighborhood established at the beginning of the 21st century. The neighborhood is named after its shape, the streets of the neighborhood and the buildings in it form the shape of a butterfly.
  -  a new neighborhood located in the east of Kiryat Bialik. It is near the Ein Afek Nature Reserve, Nahal Naaman and Tzur Shalom neighborhood.

Demographics 

According to CBS, the ethnic makeup of Kiryat Bialik in 2008 was all Jewish, without a significant Arab population. There were 17,900 males and 19,200 females. In 2003 25.8% of the population was 19 years of age or younger, 15.8% between 20 and 29, 17.4% between 30 and 44, 21.5 from 45 to 59, 3.8% from 60 to 64, and 15.6% 65 years of age or older. The population growth rate in 2005 was -0.3%.The city is ranked medium-high on the socio-economic scale (7 out of 10) Many Jewish immigrants have settled in Kiryat Bialik from Ethiopia, the former Soviet Union and Argentina.

Economy
According to CBS figures for 2002, there were 17,514 salaried workers and 912 self-employed in Kiryat Bialik. The mean monthly wage for a salaried worker  was 6,119 NIS; salaried males had a mean monthly wage of 7,851 NIS versus 4,491 NIS for females  The mean income for the self-employed was 5,996 NIS. 557 people received unemployment benefits and 2,701 people received a guaranteed minimum income.

The town was known for the Ata textile factory, established in 1934 by Erich Moller.

The Ata plant, which opened in 1934, became an icon of the Israeli textile industry. It suffered from financial problems in the 1960s and closed down in 1985.

Education
According to CBS, there are 9 schools and 6,291 students in the city: 6 elementary schools with 2,540 students, and 3 secondary education schools (2 junior high and 1 high school, under the same administration) with 3,751 students. 63.4% of 12th grade students were entitled to a Bagrut (matriculation) certificate in 2002.

Second Lebanon War (2006) 
During the Second Lebanon War in 2006, the city suffered hits from 15 Katyushas and other types of rockets sent by Hezbollah.

Notable people

 Netanel Artzi (born 1997), Israeli basketball player
Ronen Bergman (born 1972), investigative journalist and author
Shani Bloch (born 1979), Olympic racing cyclist
 Anastasia Gorbenko (born 2003), swimmer
Aviv Kochavi (born 1964), Israel Defense Forces Chief of Staff
 Amnon Pazy (1936–2006), mathematician; President of the Hebrew University of Jerusalem
Revital Sharon (born 1970), Olympic artistic gymnast
Moti Taka (born 1997), singer
Zehava Vardi, Miss Israel 1977
Yochanan Vollach (born 1945), association football player

Twin towns – sister cities

Kiryat Bialik is twinned with:

 Hlybokaye, Belarus
 İsmayıllı, Azerbaijan
 Radomsko, Poland
 Rosh HaAyin, Israel
 Steglitz-Zehlendorf (Berlin), Germany
 Chemnitz, Germany
 Zakynthos, Greece
 Zestaponi, Georgia

Gallery

References

Cities in Israel
Krayot
Cities in Haifa District
Populated places established in 1934
1934 establishments in Mandatory Palestine